Andrea P. Belz is an American innovation engineer, academic and author. She is a professor of Practice in Industrial and Systems Engineering and a Vice Dean of Transformative Initiative in the Viterbi School of Engineering at the University of Southern California (USC). 
  
Belz is most known for her work on deep technology development and commercialization, public-private partnerships, and management of internal research and development programs. Her work integrates economics and systems engineering with the development of novel tools. She authored a book titled The McGraw-Hill 36-Hour Course: Product Development. She represented Pasadena Angels on any portfolio company board, serving as a Director of Caltech laser spinoff manufacturer, Ondax until its acquisition by Coherent.
 
Belz is the current President-Elect of the IEEE Technology and Engineering Management Society (TEMS).

Education
Belz completed her BS degree in Political Science/Economics at the University of Maryland at College Park. She earned a PhD in experimental nuclear physics at the California institute of technology (Caltech) and her dissertation was titled "Investigations of novel effects in semi-inclusive deep-inelastic scattering". Later, she earned an MBA in Finance from Pepperdine University Graziadio School of Business.

Career
Early in her career Belz did postdoctoral research in geobiomicrobiology and biogeochemistry at the Jet Propulsion Laboratory (JPL) and the Caltech Geological and Planetary Science Division, studying microbial metal cycling as a model for life detection for the National Aeronautics and Space Administration (NASA).  For ten years she was a consulting systems engineer in the Mission Systems Concepts Division of the Jet Propulsion Laboratory (JPL).

Belz created and led Innovation Node-Los Angeles, a regional hub for the National Science Foundation (NSF) I-Corps program from 2014 until 2019. She then went to NSF to lead the Industrial Innovation and Partnerships (IIP) Division and served on the leadership team that launched the new Technology, Innovation, and Partnerships (TIP) Directorate, where she oversaw NSF's principal applied research programs, including the Small Business Innovation Research (SBIR), Small Business Technology Transfer Research (STTR), I-Corps, Partnerships for Innovation (PFI), and Industry-University Cooperative Research Centers (IUCRC) programs.

Belz joined the University of Southern California in 2012, where she has had appointments in the Marshall School of Business, the Iovine and Young Academy and the Viterbi School of Engineering. She has also served as a visiting professor at Caltech. She currently serves as the Vice Dean of Transformative Initiatives in the Viterbi School of Engineering.
 
Belz founded the Management of Innovation, Entrepreneurial Research, and Venture Analysis (MINERVA) lab at USC as a partnership between the Viterbi School of Engineering and Price School of Public Policy. Her work focuses on the intersection of government funding and the private sector in supporting entrepreneurship. Her project SBIR: Commercializing Invention and Financing Innovation (SCIFI) is an analysis of the NASA proposal database. She is the architect of Patentopia, an interface for the United States Patent and Trademark Office PatentsView database. She has studied the impact of gender in innovation.

Books
The McGraw-Hill 36-Hour Course: Product Development (2010) ISBN 978-0071743877

References

Living people

Year of birth missing (living people)